The Beloved Blackmailer is a 1918 American silent comedy film directed by Dell Henderson and starring Carlyle Blackwell, Evelyn Greeley and William T. Carleton. It was shot in Fort Lee, New Jersey.

Cast
 Carlyle Blackwell as 	Bobby Briggs
 William T. Carleton as Alexander Briggs 
 Isabel Berwin as Mrs. Briggs 
  Evelyn Greeley as 	Corinne Norris
 Charles Dungan as George Norris
 Jack Drumier as 	Spike Brogan
 Rex McDougall as 	Wesley Martin

References

Bibliography
 Altomara, Rita Ecke. Hollywood on the Palisades: A Filmography of Silent Features Made in Fort Lee, New Jersey, 1903-1927. Garland Pub, 1983. 
 Connelly, Robert B. The Silents: Silent Feature Films, 1910-36, Volume 40, Issue 2. December Press, 1998.
 Munden, Kenneth White. The American Film Institute Catalog of Motion Pictures Produced in the United States, Part 1. University of California Press, 1997.

External links
 

1918 films
1918 comedy films
1910s English-language films
American silent feature films
Silent American comedy films
American black-and-white films
Films directed by Dell Henderson
World Film Company films
1910s American films